is a Japanese Nippon Professional Baseball pitcher for the Hokkaido Nippon-Ham Fighters in Japan's Pacific League.

He was selected . On October 10, 2018, he was selected Japan national baseball team at the 2018 MLB Japan All-Star Series.

References

External links

1994 births
Living people
Baseball people from Chiba Prefecture
Hokkaido Nippon-Ham Fighters players
Japanese baseball players
Nippon Professional Baseball pitchers